Calu is an Etruscan chthonic deity, often equated with the Etruscan equivalent to the Greek Hades, Aita.  He is identified by his wolf attributes, such as a wolf-like appearance or a human with a wolf-skin cap. The visual representations of the cult of Calu seem to contain common elements with the Roman cult of Lupercalia and the Faliscan cult of the Hirpi Sorani ("wolves of Soranus", from Sabine hirpus "wolf").

Notes

Etruscan religion
Wolves in folklore, religion and mythology
Etruscan gods
Underworld gods